Edward Hore Kinnear (27 October 1874 – 3 March 1965) was an Australian rules footballer who played for the Essendon Football Club in the Victorian Football League (VFL).

Family
The son of George Steemson Kinnear (1825-1902), and his second wife, Susannah Hamlyn Kinnear (1840-1927), née Hore, Edward Hore Kinnear was born at Essendon, Victoria on 27 October 1874.

He married Jessie Frew Connelly (1877-1944) on 18 September 1901. They had eight children: four sons, and four daughters.

Football

Essendon (VFA)
Recruited from local club, Essendon District, in 1895, Kinnear played in 35 games and scored 8 goals for Essendon in the 1895 and 1896 (pre-VFL) VFA competition.

Essendon (VFL)
Playing in the back-pocket, Kinnear was part of the team that played in Essendon's first VFL match against Geelong, at Corio Oval, on 8 May 1897. He was also part of the Essendon team that won the 1897 premiership -- it is significant that, because the Essendon team had won the end-of-season round-robin competition contested by the top four home-and-away teams, there was no "Grand Final" required in 1897.

He was used as a full-forward in 1901 and kicked 16 goals, including five in a win over Carlton. Kinnear was a member of the Essendon team that won the premiership in the 1901 Grand Final match, against Collingwood, on 7 September 1901.

He was Essendon's vice-captain in 1901 and 1902, was acting-captain on eleven occasions in those two years, and retired as a footballer after the match against Collingwood, at Victoria park, on 8 June 1903. 

In all he appeared in ten final matches, with losing grand finals in 1898 and 1902.

100 VFL games
Towards the end of his career, and playing as a follower, Kinnear became the first Essendon player to reach 100 VFL games — that is, in addition to his 35 games for the Essendon team in the (pre-VFL) VFA competition in the 1895 and 1896 seasons — a milestone he reached when playing against Fitzroy in the 1902 Preliminary Final on 13 September 1902.

Mayor of Essendon
An Essendon councillor from 1911 to 1934, he served as the Lord Mayor of Essendon in 1919 and 1920.

Rope-maker
He had a highly successful commercial career over many years as the chairman of the major Australian rope-makers, George Kinnear & Sons Pty Ltd, until he retired at the age of 89.

Death
He died at his Essendon residence on 3 March 1965; and, with his old team-mate Joe Groves having died four years earlier (on 3 July 1961), at the time of his death Kinnear was the last surviving player of Essendon's 1897 premiership team.

Notes

References
 Kinnear, E.H., "Essendon Football Ground (Letter to the Editor)", The Herald, (Monday, 6 June 1921), p.10.
 Holmesby, Russell & Main, Jim (2014), The Encyclopedia of AFL Footballers: Every AFL/VFL Player since 1897 (10th ed.), Melbourne: Bas Publishing. 
 Lack, John (1983), "Kinnear, Edward Hore (1874–1965)", Australian Dictionary of Biography, Volume 9, Carlton: Melbourne University Press, 1983.
 Maplestone, M., Flying Higher: History of the Essendon Football Club 1872–1996, Essendon Football Club, (Melbourne), 1996.

External links

 
 Essendon past players profile
 
 Edward Hore Kinnear & Jessie Frew Kinnear, at findagrave.com.

1874 births
1965 deaths
Mayors of places in Victoria (Australia)
Australian rules footballers from Melbourne
Essendon Football Club (VFA) players
Essendon Football Club players
Essendon Football Club Premiership players
Two-time VFL/AFL Premiership players
20th-century Australian businesspeople
Ropework
Businesspeople from Melbourne
Politicians from Melbourne
People from Essendon, Victoria